Enteroctopodidae is a small family of octopuses. This family was formerly considered a subfamily of the family Octopodidae sensu lato but this family has now been divided into a number of separate families with Enteroctopodidae as one of them.

Genera
These genera are included in the family Enteroctopodidae:

 Enteroctopus Rochebrune & Mabille, 1889
 Muusoctopus Gleadall, 2004
 Sasakiopus Jorgensen, Strugnell & Allcock, 2010
 Vulcanoctopus González & Guerra, 1998

References

 
Cephalopod families